Narendran B., known professionally as Naresh Eswar, is an Indian film and television actor who predominantly appears in Malayalam and Tamil serials. He made his debut in the 2012 Malayalam serial Dosth which aired on Kairali TV, followed by several TV serials in Malayalam and Tamil language. He has acted in the 2015 Tamil thriller-drama Pudhusa Naan Poranthen.

Family and Life 
Naresh was born to Dr. Bhagavatheeswaran AS and Seethalakshmi.  He graduated with a bachelor's degree in computer applications and joined the information technology industry. He later ventured into business. With a passion for acting, he ventured into the film industry. He is married to Aiswarya Naresh Eswar, a classical dancer. They have one child, Janani Naresh Eswar.

Career 
He started his acting career with a Malayalam TV serial Dosth in the year 2012 and from there he made his way through to the Tamil TV serials as well. Handling different roles in the serials landed him the opportunity in the Tamil film Industry. He entered into the movie stream with the Tamil movie Pudhusa Naan Poranthen. He also worked in Malayalam and Tamil television serials such as Sthreepadham on Mazhavil Manorama, Azhagu on Sun TV and Parasparam on Asianet. His breakthrough role was in Pandavar Ilaam, where he plays male lead.

Filmography

Television

Advertisements 
Hairfall Ad - Malayalam - Mayukhi Herbal Hair Oil - Pankajakasthuri

References 

Year of birth missing (living people)
Living people
Tamil male television actors
Male actors in Malayalam television